Waratthaya Wongchayaporn, nicknamed Mind (born 30 December 1992 in Hat Yai, Songkhla Province Thailand) is a Thai beauty queen and the official representative of Thailand to the 2012 Miss Earth pageant.

Personal life 
Waratthaya was born and raised in Hat Yai, Songkhla Province in Southern Thailand. She studied Faculty of Liberal Arts at Sripatum University.

Pageantry 
Waratthaya competed in the Miss Universe Thailand 2012 pageant, held on 2 June 2012 at Siam Pavalai Royal Grand Theatra, Paragon Cineplex in Bangkok, Thailand, where she placed first-runner up to Farida Waller, gaining the right to represent her country at Miss Earth 2012. She was unplaced.

Filmography

Dramas

Series

Sitcom

MC
 Online 
 2021 : On Air YouTube:YAHsis Channel (24/2/2021)

References

External links
Miss Universe Thailand Official website 
MUT on facebook

Living people
1992 births
Waratthaya Wongchayaporn
Waratthaya Wongchayaporn
Miss Earth 2012 contestants
Waratthaya Wongchayaporn
Waratthaya Wongchayaporn
Thai television personalities
Waratthaya Wongchayaporn
Waratthaya Wongchayaporn
Waratthaya Wongchayaporn
Miss Earth Thailand